Roller Life is a 2016 American documentary film executive produced and directed by Michael Brown. The film's story follows the Brewcity Bruisers, a flat track roller derby league that belongs to the Women's Flat Track Derby Association, for a full season. The film follows around eight roller derby athletes and captures the essence of their lives both on and off the track. The documentary looks into misconceptions of the sport and covers the full action of the roller derby season. Roller Life premiered at the historic Oriental Theatre on October 19, 2016. It was chosen as an official selection to the 2017 Milwaukee film festival. It was added to Amazon Prime's Video streaming service on November 21, 2017.

Cast 
(All as themselves)
 Sara Hackbarth
 Shannon Huot
 Rebecca Berkshire
 Patrice Roder
 Maggie Benavides
 Patricia Frank
 Cara Wisth
 Angela Johnstad
 Deanna Danger
 Michael Brown

Film Festivals

References

External links 
 
 

2016 films
Films about competitions
Films about women's sports
Films shot in Wisconsin
Roller derby films
Roller skating films
American sports documentary films
2010s English-language films
2010s American films